or  (in Scots and English rendered as fulteachs, futtick, furtoch, furtock, etc.) is a Scottish Gaelic term which originally referred to a certain period in the agricultural calendar and which refers to the first month of the year, January, in the modern language.

Nowadays, the term has fallen out of English and Lowland Scots, but is still used in Gaelic for the month of January specifically.

The Gael of old regarded stormy weather towards the end of January as prognostic of a fruitful season to follow, or vice versa, as shown in various proverbs.

Variations
In Lewis,  fell on the Friday nearest to three weeks before the end of January, and ended on the Tuesday nearest the end of the third week of February. It was said to be three weeks of winter, and three weeks of spring.

A shorter  consisted of the last fortnight of winter, and the first fortnight of spring, in the Old Style calendar, proverbial for its variable weather. Sometimes the first half was called  (Winter ), and the second half  (Spring ).

 is also used to mean the equinoxes according to Dwelly, presumably the vernal equinox.

In Irish, the word means February instead of January.

Proverbs
 "In , the three furrows side by side should be full of water, full of snow, and full of house thatch." (presumably referring to climate and growth)
 "It comes on Friday and goes on Tuesday."

John Jamieson records another saying:

This is very similar to the Highland sentiments.

References

 
 Cassie’s Lowland Scots vocabulary
 Jamieson, John Dictionary of the (Lowland) Scots Language

Scottish folklore
Agriculture in Scotland
Scottish Gaelic language